Chopping Machine is the debut album by the stoner rock band Colour Haze, released in 1995.

Track listing 
 "Subversive" – 14:24
 "Why Don't You" – 5:50
 "Mud" – 6:38
 "Chosen Way" – 5:24
 "Dirt" – 8:57
 "God's Eyes" – 8:31
 "Sometimes" – 4:15
 "Chopping Machine" – 6:10

1995 albums
Colour Haze albums